Belle Smith Wheelan (born October 10, 1951) is an American educator who served as Virginia Secretary of Education under Governor Mark Warner. She is currently the President and Chief Executive Officer of the Southern Association of Colleges and Schools' Commission on Colleges.

References

External links
 Virginia Secretary of Education

Living people
1951 births
State cabinet secretaries of Virginia
Women in Virginia politics
African-American people in Virginia politics
African-American women in politics
African-American state cabinet secretaries
Louisiana State University alumni
Trinity University (Texas) alumni
University of Texas at Austin alumni
Politicians from Chicago
American women chief executives
American chief executives of education-related organizations
21st-century African-American people
21st-century African-American women
20th-century African-American people
20th-century African-American women